North Hills Country Club is a country club which was relocated in the 1960s to North Hills, New York, United States. The club was founded in 1927 at the current location of Douglaston Park.

The golf course in North Hills was designed by Robert Trent Jones in 1961.

References

External links
 

North Hills, New York
Golf clubs and courses in New York (state)
Clubs and societies in the United States
Sports venues completed in 1927
Sports venues in Long Island
Golf clubs and courses designed by Robert Trent Jones
Town of North Hempstead, New York
Sports venues in Nassau County, New York
1927 establishments in New York (state)